Juremy Reker (born 30 March 1990 in Amsterdam) is a Dutch footballer who played for Eerste Divisie club FC Eindhoven during the 2009-2010 football season.

References

External links
 voetbal international profile

Dutch footballers
Footballers from Amsterdam
FC Eindhoven players
Eerste Divisie players
1990 births
Living people
Association football defenders